The  is a toll road in Miyagi Prefecture, Japan. It is owned and operated by the East Nippon Expressway Company (NEXCO East Japan). Along with the Sanriku Expressway, Sendai-Hokubu Road, Sendai-Nanbu Road, and Tōhoku Expressway the northern portion of the road forms a ring road around the city, Sendai, known as the "Gurutto Sendai". The route is signed E6 under Ministry of Land, Infrastructure, Transport and Tourism's  "2016 Proposal for Realization of Expressway Numbering."

Junction list
The entire expressway is in Miyagi Prefecture.

See also

Japan National Route 6

References

External links

 East Nippon Expressway Company

Roads in Miyagi Prefecture
Toll roads in Japan
1994 establishments in Japan